These are the Official Charts Company's UK Independent Albums Chart number ones of 2022.

Chart history

See also
 List of UK Rock & Metal Albums Chart number ones of 2022
 List of UK Album Downloads Chart number ones of 2022
 List of UK Dance Albums Chart number ones of 2022
 List of UK R&B Albums Chart number ones of 2022
 List of UK Independent Singles Chart number ones of 2022

References

External links
Independent Albums Top 40 at the Official Charts Company
UK Top 40 Indie Album Chart at BBC Radio 1

2022 in British music
United Kingdom Indie Albums
2022